Albawings is an Albanian low-cost airline headquartered in Tirana and based at its hub at Tirana International Airport Nënë Tereza.

History
Albawings was founded in February 2015. Albawings was awarded the Air Operator's Certificate (AOC) by the Albanian Civil Aviation Authority on 4 February 2016. The first aircraft of the company, a Boeing 737-500, with which Albawings started its operations, is called "Spirit of Tirana".

On 11 December 2016, the second aircraft was delivered by Bruce Dickinson. The leased plane was a Boeing 737-400 owned by Cardiff Aviation and it is named after Sir Norman Wisdom, who was a very popular actor for Albanians during the communist regime of Enver Hoxha, mainly for his role of Mr. Pitkin.

It has been recently reported that Albawings entered a codeshare agreement with Neos for flights to Milan-Malpensa Airport and to New York-JFK Airport.

Destinations

The airline operates flights to several Italian destinations.

Codeshare agreements
The Italian airline Neos and Albawings established a new codeshare partnership on June 16, 2022, covering two of the company's four weekly flights between Tirana and Milan Malpensa. Upon receiving certification from the US Department of Transportation, the two also intend to expand their codeshare arrangement to include Neos' Milan Malpensa–New York JFK route on the codeshare agreement.

Fleet

The fleet consists of the following aircraft (as of February 2020):

References

External links

 

Airlines of Albania
Albanian brands
Airlines established in 2015
Low-cost carriers